The Cathedral of the Incarnation is an Episcopal cathedral in Garden City, New York. It is the seat of the Episcopal Diocese of Long Island.

Built to the memory of Alexander Turney Stewart, the Cathedral of the Incarnation is the only cathedral in the United States funded by a single person, and the only one that is built in memory of a single individual. The cathedral is a product of Gothic Revival architecture.

The cathedral is historically known for its music ministry, led by Canon Lawrence Tremsky (Northwestern University, M.M.). The Men & Boys Choir, which originated during the 19th century, was the reason that the train station in the area was initially constructed - to transport the boys from their homes in Brooklyn or Manhattan to rehearsals and services. During the 1930s, the cathedral formed the first American cathedral girls' choir - known as the Schola Cantorum. The choirs sing a repertoire of choral music, from plainsong to modern works, selected carefully to coincide with the themes of the season. Evensong is sung on the first Sunday of each month in the traditional English cathedral model (Magnificat, Nunc Dimittis, an anthem, and Anglican chant psalms). Special seasonal liturgies include traditional "Lessons & Carols" one or two Sundays before Christmas.
The cathedral is notable for its stained glass windows and icons. The mural icon of Christ Pantokrator, permanently installed at the cathedral, was crafted by the American artist Guillermo Esparza.

A new organ was constructed by the firm Casavant Frères Limitée in 1986 on the 110th anniversary of the death of A. T. Stewart.

Tours are offered upon request, as well as the cathedral being open from 9:00 am to 4:00 pm (Tuesday - Friday).

There are a variety of services held throughout the week including weekday Morning Prayer, weekday Compline, and Sunday services including the Family Mass at 9:15 (held outdoors during the summer under the tent, and is pet-friendly) and the 11:15 Choral Eucharist featuring music by the cathedral choirs.

See also
List of the Episcopal cathedrals of the United States
List of cathedrals in the United States

References

External links
Official website
Diocese of Long Island website

Garden City, New York
Incarnation, Garden City
Churches on the National Register of Historic Places in New York (state)
Churches in Nassau County, New York
Historic district contributing properties in New York (state)
National Register of Historic Places in Nassau County, New York
Churches completed in 1871